Kilikollur railway station (Code:KLQ) is a railway station in the cashew hub of Kollam city – Kilikollur. Kilikollur railway station is coming under the Madurai railway division of the Southern Railway zone, Indian Railways. The station is one among the three railway stations serving the city of Kollam. Other railway stations in the city are Kollam Junction railway station and Eravipuram railway station. All the trains passing through have halt in this station, except the Tambaram–Kollam Special Express running on the newly commissioned Punalur–Sengottai line.
Kilikollur railway station is situated at Karicode

Indian Railways is connecting Kilikollur with various cities in India like Kollam, Thiruvananthapuram, Kottayam, Ernakulam, Thrissur, Nagercoil, Tirunelveli, Madurai  & with various towns like Punalur, Paravur, Kottarakkara, Kayamkulam, Karunagappalli, Varkala, Neyyattinkara & Kanyakumari. Nearest railway stations are Kollam Junction and Chandanathoppe.

Services

See also
 Kollam Junction railway station
 Paravur railway station
 Punalur railway station
 Kundara railway station

References

Railway stations in Kollam
Kilikollur
Thiruvananthapuram railway division
1904 establishments in India
Railway stations opened in 1904